Preble County District Library (PCDL) is a multi-branch library system that serves the various cities and villages of Preble County, Ohio. It has seven branches across the Preble County, along with the Library Administration and Resource Center and the Preble County Room (local history and genealogy), both located at 450 S. Barron Street in Eaton.

The Library Administration and Resource Center hours are Monday through Friday, 8:00am–5:00pm.

The main library branch, located in downtown Eaton, is open Monday through Thursday, 9:00am–8:00pm, and Friday through Saturday, 9:00am–5:00pm.

The hours at the other branches vary according to location.

History
The Preble County District Library was formed in 1959 with the consolidation of six small, independent libraries (located in Camden, Eaton, Eldorado, New Paris, West Elkton, and West Alexandria). That year, the Campbellstown Library closed and turned their holdings over to the newly formed system. In 1961, a library was created in West Manchester; it joined PCDL later in the year. In February 1996, the library administration and the genealogy department moved from the Eaton branch into a new building (the former Traditions Restaurant) on the south end of Eaton.

Locations and hours

Library Administration and Resource Center  
450 S. Barron StreetEaton, Ohio 45320
Monday-Friday: 8-5

Camden Branch Library  
104 S. Main Street
Camden, Ohio 45311
Monday: 12-8
Tuesday: 2-8
Wednesday: 12-8
Thursday: 12-8
Friday: 10-2
Saturday: 10-2

Eaton Branch Library  
301 N. Barron St.
Eaton, OH 45320
Monday-Thursday: 9-8
Friday-Saturday: 9-5

Eldorado Branch Library  
150 N. Main St.
Eldorado, Ohio 45321
Tuesday: 12-6
Thursday: 12-6
Saturday: 1-4

New Paris Branch Library  
115 N. Washington StreetNew Paris, OH 45347
Monday-Wednesday: 2-8
Friday: 10-4
Saturday: 10-2

Preble County Room (Genealogy)  
450 S. Barron StreetEaton, Ohio 45320
Tuesday-Thursday: 9-5
Friday: 9-3
1st and 3rd Saturdays: 9-5

West Alexandria Branch Library  
16 N. Main StreetTown HallWest Alexandria, Ohio 45381
Monday, Wednesday: 12-7
Tuesday: 1-7
Friday: 12-4
Saturday: 10-2

West Elkton Branch Library  
135 N. Main St.Town HallWest Elkton, Ohio, 45070
Monday, Wednesday: 1-6
Thursday: 1-6

West Manchester Branch Library  
212 S. High StreetWest Manchester, Ohio 45382
Monday: 12-6
Wednesday: 12-6
Saturday: 9:30-12:30

References

External links
Preble County District Library
Preble County District Library Catalog
Preble County District Library Facebook page

Education in Preble County, Ohio
Public libraries in Ohio
Eaton, Ohio